The 1998 World Allround Speed Skating Championships were held on 13–15 March 1998 in the Thialf stadium in Heerenveen, Netherlands.

Gunda Niemann-Stirnemann and Ids Postma were the world title holders from the previous year and successfully defended their titles. It was Niemann-Stirnemann's seventh all-round world title.

Allround results

Men

Women

bold signifies championship record.

References

External links
Results on SpeedSkatingNews

1998 World Allround
World Allround Speed Skating Championships
World Allround, 1998